Barney Blake, Police Reporter is an American crime drama that aired live on NBC from April 22, 1948 to July 8, 1948. NBC claimed it was the first mystery series to air on TV. The program was canceled after thirteen weeks by its sponsor American Tobacco Company.

Premise
The series centers on Barney Blake and his secretary Jennifer Allen who solved murders. 

Episodes included "E-String Murder" on May 6, 1948.

Critical reaction
The show's premiere episode was panned in a review in the trade publication Billboard. Jerry Franken wrote that the script's shortcomings undermined the "slick, Class A production". Franken predicted that if the program's scripts did not improve, the show "will go down in history not only as the first but also the worst of its breed."

Personnel
Gene O'Donnell portrayed Barney Blake, and Judy Parrish played Jennifer Allen. David Lewis was the director.

References

External links
 

1948 American television series debuts
1948 American television series endings
American crime drama television series
NBC original programming
Black-and-white American television shows
English-language television shows
American live television series